Lchashen is a village in the Sevan Municipality of the Gegharkunik Province of Armenia.

History 
The settlement dates back to the 3rd millennium BC. It has a Bronze Age cemetery, a Urartian Iron Age fortress, and a 13th-century church. It is an important archaeological site associated with the Lchashen-Metsamor culture (Etiuni).

Gallery

References

External links 

 
 
 

Populated places in Gegharkunik Province